The Drinker's Court, also known as Bandbox Court Houses, is located in the Society Hill section of Philadelphia, Pennsylvania. The houses were built in 1764 by John Drinker (1716–1787), father of noted American portrait artist John Drinker (1760–1826).

They were added to the National Register of Historic Places on May 27, 1971.

See also
National Register of Historic Places listings in Center City, Philadelphia

References

External links

Historic American Buildings Survey in Philadelphia
Houses on the National Register of Historic Places in Philadelphia
Houses completed in 1765
Society Hill, Philadelphia